Grindstone Island Upper Schoolhouse is a historic one-room school building located on Grindstone Island, Clayton, Jefferson County, New York.  It was built in 1885, and is a 1 1/2-story, three bay by one bay, frame building on a granite foundation. The building includes a vestibule and small teachers apartment.  Also on the property is a contributing well pump.  It operated until 1989, making it the last one-room school in operation in New York State.

It was added to the National Register of Historic Places in 2012.

References

One-room schoolhouses in New York (state)
School buildings on the National Register of Historic Places in New York (state)
School buildings completed in 1885
Schools in Jefferson County, New York
National Register of Historic Places in Jefferson County, New York